Michael William Sleep (born March 13, 1955) is a Canadian former professional ice hockey player who played in the World Hockey Association (WHA). Drafted in the sixth round of the 1975 NHL Amateur Draft by the New York Islanders, Sleep opted to play in the WHA after being selected by the Phoenix Roadrunners in the fifth round of the 1975 WHA Amateur Draft. He played parts of two WHA seasons for the Roadrunners. Sleep was born in Montreal, Quebec.

References

External links

1955 births
Living people
Anglophone Quebec people
Canadian ice hockey right wingers
Flin Flon Bombers players
Green Bay Bobcats players
New Westminster Bruins players
New York Islanders draft picks
Oklahoma City Blazers (1965–1977) players
Phoenix Roadrunners (WHA) players
Phoenix Roadrunners draft picks
St. James Canadians players
Ice hockey people from Montreal
Tucson Mavericks players
Canadian expatriate ice hockey players in the United States